Love Will Find a Way is a jazz album by Philip Bailey released in 2019 on Verve Records. The album reached No. 1 on both the Billboard Top Jazz Albums chart and the Billboard Contemporary Jazz Albums chart.

Overview
Love Will Find a Way was produced by Philip Bailey. Artists such as Bilal, Chick Corea, Kamasi Washington, Will I Am and Robert Glasper also featured on the album.

Critical reception

With a four out of five stars rating Mike Hobart of the Financial Times wrote "The 12th solo album from Earth Wind and Fire’s lead singer underscores his octave-spanning falsetto with generation-crossing, jazz-heavy support. The A-list collaborators include Chick Corea, Kamasi Washington and Christian Scott aTunde Adjuah alongside drummers Steve Gadd and Kendrick Scott. With pianist Robert Glasper heavily involved in production, the jazz influence goes deeper than the instrumental breaks which embellish most tracks." Andrew Gilbert of Jazz Times exclaimed "Bailey sounds energized by the contributions of 21st-century jazz players steeped in the EWF catalog like bassist Derrick Hodge, drummer Kendrick Scott, and keyboardist Robert Glasper." Gilbert added "Amid a resurgence of the spiritual jazz sound, Bailey offers a welcome reminder that the L.A.-based EWF played a vital role in its creation."

Music critic Ann Powers of NPR placed Love Will Find a Way at No. 5 on her list of the Top Ten Albums of 2019. Phil Freeman of Stereogum also gave Love Will Find a Way an honourable mention in his list of the Ten Best Jazz Albums of 2019.

Track listing

Personnel 
 Philip Bailey – lead and backing vocals, percussion, arrangements
 Kenny Barron – acoustic piano 
 Chick Corea – keyboards
 Robert Glasper – keyboards, arrangements 
 Casey Benjamin – vocoder (10), saxophone (10)
 Adam Hawley – guitar 
 Lionel Loueke – guitar 
 Adam Rogers – guitar 
 Mike Severson – guitar 
 Alex Al – bass
 Carlos del Puerto – bass 
 Derrick Hodge – bass 
 Christian McBride – bass, backing vocals, arrangements 
 Teddy Campbell – drums 
 Steve Gadd – drums 
 will.I.am – drums, arrangements 
 Jerome Jennings – drums 
 Kendrick Scott – drums 
 Manolo Badrena – percussion 
 Luisito Quintera – percussion 
 Kevin Richard – percussion 
 Steve Wilson – flute, saxophone
 Miguel Gandelman – tenor saxophone 
 Kamasi Washington – saxophone 
 Garrett Smith – trombone 
 Ray Monteiro – trumpet 
 Christian Scott – trumpet 
 Alisha Bauer – cello 
 Ginger Murphy – cello
 Daphne Chen – violin 
 Lisa Dondlinger – violin, concertmaster 
 Herman Jackson – arrangements 
 Valerie Bailey – backing vocals
 Bridgette Bryant – backing vocals 
 Joey Diggs – backing vocals
 Bilal – lead and backing vocals (3)

Production 
 Philip Bailey – producer, executive producer, liner notes 
 Robert Glasper – producer (1, 3, 5, 8)
 Chick Corea – producer (2)
 Christian McBride – producer (4, 9)
 will.I.am – producer (4)
 Herman Jackson – producer (6, 7, 10)
 Harvey Mason, Jr. – vocal producer 
 Trinity Bailey – executive producer
 Russell Elevado – recording, mixing
 Bernie Kirsh – recording 
 Keith Lewis – recording 
 Brian Montgomery – recording 
 Dave Rideau – recording 
 Alex DeTurk – mastering 
 Rafaela Hernández – production manager 
 Ferni Onafowokan – A&R administration 
 Natalie Weber – A&R manager 
 Philip Doran Bailey – project consultant 
 Josh Cheuse – creative director 
 Tishaun Dawson – A&R direction, design 
 Jabari Jacobs – photography

Studios
 Recorded at Brooklyn Recording (Brooklyn, NY); Record Plant (Los Angeles, CA); Mungo Bungo Studio (Rancho Cucamongo, CA); Harvey Mason Media (North Hollywood, CA).
 Mastered at The Bunker (Brooklyn, NY).

References

2019 albums
Verve Records albums
Philip Bailey albums